Mount Olive Cemetery may refer to:

In the United States:

 Mount Olive Cemetery, Chicago, Illinois
 Mount Olive Cemetery (Jackson, Mississippi)